The Afşin-Elbistan power stations are coal-fired power stations in Afşin in Kahramanmaraş Province in Turkey.  The area is a sulfur dioxide air pollution hotspot: Air pollution can be trapped by the surrounding mountains, and Greenpeace say that measurements they took nearby in late 2020 show illegal levels of  particulates and nitrogen oxides. The Environment Ministry has not released the flue gas measurements.

 the power station owners still want to build more coal-fired capacity, despite public opposition.

Coal
Local lignite's calorific value is under 5 MJ/kg, which is a quarter of typical thermal coal.

Afşin-Elbistan A

Afşin-Elbistan A power station is a 1355 MW lignite-fired power station, owned by Çelikler Holding, which was shut down in January 2020 due to local air pollution, but reopened in later in 2020. Head of the parliamentary home affairs commission, Celalettin Guveç, said in December that delivery of flue-gas desulfurization parts had been delayed by the covid-19 pandemic and that the filters would be installed by the end of March 2021.

History
It was depicted on the reverse of the Turkish 5000 liras banknotes of 1990–1994.

Technology
The plant burns lignite, which is transported by conveyor belt from the nearby Kışlaköy coal mine. It was shut down for refurbishment in 2017.  After burning 2% of the lignite remains as slag and 18% as fly ash, and a new landfill site was planned for both of these in 2019.

Opposition
In January 2019 locals complained that the plant had been restarted causing visible ash pollution in the snow, and local MP Sefer Aycan said in parliament he was concerned that the plant would add to the industrial pollution of the Aksu and Ceyhan rivers.
In March 2019 Greenpeace projected the message "These chimneys are spitting poison" onto the plant, to publicise their earlier report claiming that, together with neighbouring Afşin-Elbistan B, the plants were responsible for 17,000 premature deaths. The area is a sulfur dioxide air pollution hotspot. According to energy analyst Haluk Direskeneli, writing in 2019, flue-gas desulfurization is not installed and electrostatic precipitation is inadequate, and "it is futile to repair this power plant".

Shutdown and reopening 
The plant was shut down in January 2020 as it did not meet the flue gas emission limits which came into force that month. Çelikler planned to have filters installed by June 2020. The plant reopened but complaints of air pollution continued, and in October 2021 it was said by opposition MP Ali Öztunç to be still operating without filters due to company lobbying.  In November 2020 the company said that the fuel oil system had been replaced by gas and dry flue gas filters had been completed and that they intended to complete wet flue gas filters in 2021.

Afşin-Elbistan B

Afşin-Elbistan B power station is a 1440MW lignite-fired power station in Afşin in Kahramanmaraş Province in Turkey state owned by EÜAŞ. The plant burns lignite from Kışlaköy coal mine (mostly transported by lorry) and sometimes from other mines.

Opponents said in September 2020 that ash retention filters are disabled on the pretext that they are expensive to clean. An environmental impact report for proposed ash and slag storage was approved in 2020. It is estimated that closing the plant by 2030, instead of when its licence ends in 2052, would prevent over 3000 premature deaths.

Opposition 
In December 2021 environmental group TEMA Foundation said that air quality measurements had not been taken in Karamanmaraş for almost 11 months of 2020, and that it was very worrying that the plants continued to operate on temporary permits without the necessary environmental improvements.

Afşin-Elbistan C

Afşin-Elbistan C is an 1800 MW lignite-fired power station approved to be built for the state-owned generating company. According to the Afşin-Elbistan C environmental impact assessment (EIA), it would emit more than 61 million tonnes of  annually. For comparison, the total annual greenhouse gas emissions by Turkey are about 500 million tonnes; thus the power station would add over 10% if operated at the targeted capacity factor.

Public Opinion

According to a 2020 survey from nearby Kahramanmaraş Sütçüimam University most locals say they have chronic illness, and almost all believe that environmental protection measures taken by power plant managers are insufficient. Opponents of the plants say that: "a significant portion of the people living in Afşin Elbistan are struggling with respiratory tract or cancer diseases."

Notes

References

Sources

See also 
Coal power in Turkey

External links 
 "Afşin-Elbistan power complex" on Global Energy Monitor
 Report on health effects (in Turkish) by the Right to Clean Air Platform Turkey

Coal-fired power stations in Turkey